Donegal explosion may refer to:

 Ballymanus mine disaster, in 1943: 18 people killed when trying to drag an unexploded naval mine ashore
 Creeslough explosion, in 2022: 10 people killed in an explosion at a petrol station and nearby shops and apartments